The men's decathlon event at the 1982 Commonwealth Games was held on 4 and 5 October at the QE II Stadium in Brisbane, Australia.

Results

References

Day 1 results (The Sydney Morning Herald)
Day 2 results (The Sydney Morning Herald)
Day 1 results (The Canberra Times)
Day 2 results (The Canberra Times)
Australian results 

Athletics at the 1982 Commonwealth Games
1982